Sherley is a surname. Notable people with the surname include:

Douglass Sherley (1857–1917), author, journalist, and poet
Glen Sherley (1936–1978), country singer-songwriter, wrote Johnny Cash's 1968 song Greystone Chapel
Haydn Sherley (1924–2007), New Zealand radio personality
J. Swagar Sherley (1871–1941), U.S. Representative from Kentucky
James Sherley, biological engineer at Boston Biomedical Research Institute

See also
Sherley Anne Williams (1944–1999), African-American poet